Mark R. Wise is a retired United States Marine Corps lieutenant general who last served as the Deputy Commandant for Aviation of the United States Marine Corps. Previously, he was the Assistant Deputy Commandant for Combat Development and Integration of the United States Marine Corps and Deputy Commanding General of the Marine Corps Combat Development Command.

References

|-

|-

Living people
Place of birth missing (living people)
Recipients of the Defense Superior Service Medal
Recipients of the Legion of Merit
United States Marine Corps generals
United States Marine Corps personnel of the Gulf War
United States Marine Corps personnel of the War in Afghanistan (2001–2021)
Year of birth missing (living people)